Salamandrina perspicillata, the northern spectacled salamander, is a species of salamander in the family Salamandridae found only in Italy.

The IUCN Red List follows Mattoccia et al. (2005) and Canestrelli et al. (2006) in separating Salamandrina perspicillata from Salamandrina terdigitata which is found further south.
The Salamander undergoes a long development period. Once the female salamander spawn in a body of water, the eggs begin to hatch into larvae, these larvae are unrecognizable until they develop via metamorphosis when they develop their unique markings.

References

External links

Mays, M. 2019. "Salamandrina perspicillata" (On-line), Animal Diversity Web. Accessed October 28, 2022 at https://animaldiversity.org/accounts/Salamandrina_perspicillata/

Amphibians of Europe
Salamandridae
Endemic fauna of Italy
Amphibians described in 1821